Gladiolus 'Princess Margaret Rose' is a cultivar of Gladiolus which features fiery hot colors, a mix of red, orange and yellow flowers. The ruffled blossoms are arranged closely and symmetrically on strong and erect spikes adorned by pointed sword-like leaves.

It can be sited in sun or partial shade.

It was trialled at RHS Garden, Wisley in 1949.

References

See also 
 List of Gladiolus varieties

Princess Margaret